Outside These Walls is a 1939 American crime film directed by Ray McCarey and starring Michael Whalen, Dolores Costello and Virginia Weidler.

Plot
Walen plays Dan Sparling, a convicted embezzler who becomes editor of his prison newspaper. After serving out his sentence, he sets up an independent newspaper devoted to attacking corruption in public life, encountering various difficulties due to his being an ex-con and opposition from the incumbent administration.

Cast
 Michael Whalen as Dan Sparling 
 Dolores Costello as Margaret Bronson 
 Virginia Weidler as Ellen Sparling
 Don Beddoe as Dinky 
 Selmer Jackson as John Wilson
 Mary Forbes as Gertrude Bishop
 Robert Emmett Keane as Sam Fulton
 Pierre Watkin as Hewitt Bronson
 Kathleen Lockhart as Miss Thronton
 Dick Curtis as Flint

See also
 List of American films of 1939

External links

References

1939 films
1939 drama films
American drama films
American black-and-white films
Columbia Pictures films
Films about journalists
Films directed by Ray McCarey
American prison films
Films scored by Morris Stoloff
1930s English-language films
1930s American films